Rollin Mallory Daggett (February 22, 1831 – November 12, 1901) was a 19th-century American politician, minister, and diplomat. Daggett served a single term as a United States representative from Nevada from 1879 to 1881.

Biography 
Daggett was born on February 22, 1831, in Richville, St. Lawrence County, New York.

He had served in the Nevada Territorial Council. Later he was the United States Minister Resident to the Kingdom of Hawaii from 1882 to 1885. A member of the Sagebrush School, Daggett was also a writer. 

He died on November 12, 1901, in San Francisco, California and was buried at Laurel Hill Cemetery (which is no longer open).

References

Further reading

'Rollin Mallory Daggett' (2007) in Gale Literature: Contemporary Authors, Farmington Hills, MI: Gale.

External links
 

1831 births
1901 deaths
Members of the Nevada Territorial Legislature
People from St. Lawrence County, New York
19th-century American diplomats
Sagebrush School
Republican Party members of the United States House of Representatives from Nevada
19th-century American politicians
Burials at Laurel Hill Cemetery (San Francisco)